Perta was a town of ancient Lycaonia, inhabited in Roman and Byzantine times. The town appears as Petra on the Tabula Peutingeriana.

Its site is located near Gimir, known as İpekler in Karatay district, Asiatic Turkey.

References

Populated places in ancient Lycaonia
Former populated places in Turkey
Roman towns and cities in Turkey
Populated places of the Byzantine Empire
History of Konya Province